Aleksandar Stanisavljević (born 11 June 1989) is a Serbian football player who plays for Uzbekistan Super League club  Qizilqum.

Club career
Born in Požarevac, SR Serbia, Stanisavljević moved to Austria during the 1990s to escape the Yugoslav War. He played there as well as in Hungary before returning to Serbia in 2013 to play with Serbian First League side FK Sloga Petrovac na Mlavi. During the winter break of the 2013–14 season he joined Serbian SuperLiga side OFK Beograd, and in summer 2014 he moved to another SuperLiga club, FK Donji Srem. On the beginning of 2015, he moved to Vojvodina where he made an impact in the games of UEFA Europa League especially in the glorious 4–0 away win against Italian club Sampdoria, having one goal and one assist. On 24 December 2015, he signed a 3,5 years' contract with the Greek Super League side Asteras Tripoli for an undisclosed fee.

References

External links
 Player Profile at HLSZ
 
 

1989 births
Living people
Sportspeople from Požarevac
Austrian footballers
Serbian footballers
Association football midfielders
Austrian expatriate footballers
SV Ried players
First Vienna FC players
Zalaegerszegi TE players
OFK Beograd players
FK Donji Srem players
FK Sloga Petrovac na Mlavi players
FK Vojvodina players
Asteras Tripolis F.C. players
FK Radnički Niš players
Bnei Sakhnin F.C. players
FK Voždovac players
FC Caspiy players
FC Kaisar players
Serbian SuperLiga players
Israeli Premier League players
Kazakhstan Premier League players
Expatriate footballers in Greece
Expatriate footballers in Hungary
Expatriate footballers in Israel
Expatriate footballers in Kazakhstan
Austrian expatriate sportspeople in Greece
Austrian expatriate sportspeople in Hungary
Austrian expatriate sportspeople in Israel
Austrian expatriate sportspeople in Kazakhstan
Serbian expatriate sportspeople in Hungary
Serbian expatriate sportspeople in Israel
Serbian expatriate sportspeople in Kazakhstan
Austrian people of Serbian descent